The 1923 San Diego mayoral election was held on March 20, 1923 to elect the mayor for San Diego. Incumbent mayor John L. Bacon stood for reelection. In the primary election, Bacon received a majority of the votes and was elected outright with no need for a contested runoff.

Candidates
John L. Bacon, Mayor of San Diego
Charles E. Rinehart
Willis H.P. Shelton
William I. Kinsley
Oriel C. Jones

Campaign
Incumbent Mayor John L. Bacon stood for reelection to a second term. On March 20, 1921, Bacon received an absolute majority of 59.6 percent in the primary election, more than 23 percent higher than his nearest competitor, Charles E. Rinehart. Bacon received one hundred percent of the vote in the uncontested runoff election held April 3, 1923 and was elected to the office of the mayor.

Primary Election results

General Election results
Because Bacon won outright in the primary with a majority of the vote, his was the only eligible name on the runoff ballot.

References

1923
1923 California elections
1923
1923 United States mayoral elections
March 1923 events